No. 2 High School of East China Normal University is a high school located in Zhangjiang High-Tech Park, Pudong, Shanghai, China.

Overview
Founded in 1958, No. 2 High School of East China Normal University is the only 'key high school' in Shanghai that is under direct auspices of the country's Ministry of Education other than Shanghai Foreign Language School, a school specialized in foreign language. It is most well known for its outstanding performance in international, continental, national and regional science contests. A number of 22 gold medals is won in International Mathematical Olympiad, International Physics Olympiad, International Chemistry Olympiad, International Olympiad in Informatics, and International Biology Olympiad as of 2009, the most in Mainland China. This high school is also known as one of the best four public high schools in Shanghai. 

The school is located in the Zhangjiang Hi-tech Park with convenient transportation, and covers an area of 10 ha with first-class basic establishment. No. 2 High School Attached to East China Normal University is a boarding school and at present, has a total of more than 1400 students and a total staff of 140. In 1999, its International Division was established and approved by the Shanghai Municipal Government for enrolling foreign students, aged 12 to 18, for junior and senior high school education.  

The school serves as an HSK testing center, as well as a 'Base' under the direct auspices of the Office of Chinese Language Council International of the People's Republic of China for teaching Chinese as a foreign language. In addition, the school provides Chinese language teaching as an established subsidiary of the Overseas Chinese Affairs Office of the State Council.

Alternative names
The school has (or has had) the following names:

 No. 2 High School of East China Normal University, official English name since 1999.
 No. 2 Secondary School of East China Normal University, school name used by College Board.
 No. 2 Secondary School attached to East China Normal University, out-dated since 1999, when International Department was built and the school planned moving from its original address (896 Zaoyang Rd., since built to 2002) to 555 Chenhui Rd., Pudong district in Shanghai.

School view

See also
 No. 1 High School Affiliated to East China Normal University

References

External links

 No. 2 High School of ECNU official website
 International Division of No.2 High School of ECNU
 No.2 High School of ECNU, Chinese Language Education Service for Foreigners
 UNESCO program: Strengthening the Second Secondary School attached to East China Normal University

High schools in Shanghai
East China Normal University
East China Normal University
Educational institutions established in 1958
1958 establishments in China
Schools in Pudong